is the name of multiple train stations in Japan. The literal meaning of Oiwake is Junction.

 Oiwake Station (Akita) - in Akita Prefecture
 Oiwake Station (Hokkaido) - in Hokkaido Prefecture
 Oiwake Station (Mie) - in Mie Prefecture
 Oiwake Station (Shiga) - in Shiga Prefecture